Middle Caicos Airport  is an airport serving Middle Caicos (also known as Grand Caicos), the largest island in the Turks and Caicos Islands.

Facilities

References

External links
 

Airports in the Turks and Caicos Islands